Club Deportivo Popular Junior F.C. S.A., commonly known as Junior de Barranquilla, by its old name Atlético Junior, or simply as Junior, is a Colombian professional football team based in Barranquilla, that currently plays in the Categoría Primera A. Junior is the main Caribbean team in the top flight of Colombian football. In present day they are sitting in the 25th place in best South American team as of 2022.

The club was founded on August 7, 1924. Known as Los Tiburones (The Sharks), or El Equipo Tiburón (The Shark Team). Junior have won the Colombian professional football championship nine times (1977, 1980, 1993, 1995, 2004 Finalización, 2010 Apertura, 2011 Finalización, 2018 Finalización and 2019 Apertura). Some of the most notable players that have played for the club include Heleno de Freitas, Garrincha, Dida, Juan Ramón Verón, Efraín Sánchez, Carlos "El Pibe" Valderrama, Iván Valenciano, Teófilo Gutiérrez, Carlos Bacca, Julio César Uribe, Giovanni Hernández, Sebastián Viera and Luis Díaz.

History
In the early 1920s a team named Juventus came into being at the Colegio Salesiano in the San Roque neighborhood of Barranquilla, unsurprisingly given the name made up primarily of Italian immigrants. Soon after its launch the name was changed to the Spanish Juventud, though both translate the same in English: youth. In August 1924 some of the younger members of Juventud along with other young men from San Roque created an offshoot of Juventud: Juventud Infantil.

Around the 1940s (and the club's name was shortened to simply Junior) they became known as one of the country's best clubs. In 1945 the players of Junior were selected to represent Colombia at the South American Championship (now known as the Copa América), finishing a respectable fifth (though losing 7–0 to Uruguay and 9–1 to Argentina along the way). In 1949 they were again selected to represent Colombia (finishing last place) but this time their decision to play would have its consequences.

In 1948 Junior were founder members of División Mayor del Fútbol Profesional Colombiano (commonly known as the Dimayor). Their debut match as a professional outfit came at home on August 15, 1948, against Deportivo Cali, which ended in a 2–0 victory for the home side. Early the following year they were again chosen to play as the de facto Colombia national team. Because of ongoing strife between Adefutbol (the original amateur Colombian football association) and the Dimayor, Junior were threatened with expulsion from the Dimayor if they participated. They went ahead and did so and were initially given a two-year suspension from the league. This was later reduced to one year and they returned to the Dimayor for the 1950 season.

This was the golden age of Colombian football commonly referred to as El Dorado, a time when the Dimayor was a "rebel league" unaffiliated with FIFA and many high-profile players from around the world broke their contracts and came to play. Junior were no exception, picking up players from Brazil, Argentina, Hungary and the Czech Republic in these years. But El Dorado eventually came to an end for Colombian football.

A way ahead surfaced in the mid-1960s when a rift had again developed in Colombian football, this time between Adefutbol and the newly created Federación Colombiana de Fútbol, an organization devoted to developing professional football in the country. Adefutbol was still the official body in the eyes of FIFA and organized the national team in this period and additionally Colombian clubs did not enter the Copa Libertadores. Peace was finally made and the bulk of the amateur team that had attempted to qualify for the England World Cup signed up for Junior, who returned to the Dimayor in 1966. Junior have remained in the top level ever since.

In 1977 Junior won their first Colombian championship, finishing first place in the Apertura. They won further championships in 1980, 1993, 1995, the 2004-II (Finalización), the 2010-I (Apertura), and the 2011-II (Finalizacion). Junior have appeared in the Copa Libertadores nine times (reaching the semi-finals in 1994), and the Copa Sudamericana and Copa CONMEBOL once each.

Symbols

Badge
The team's badge has a Swiss shape; it's 6 cm wide by 8 cm tall, divided into two horizontal stripes. 
The inferior stripe is divided into 9 vertical white and red stripes. The superior part is another horizontal blue stripe where the stars are placed. The stars have 9 points; each star represents a league championships the team has won.

Flag
Junior's flag is composed of 9 horizontal stripes representing the 9 stars they have now, 5 red and 4 white ones which alternate, the superior and the inferior ones are red. Overlapped on top of the strips there is a blue triangle. This triangle occupies all the wide of the flag on its vertical side. The white stars are superimposed on the triangle.

Honours

Domestic
 Categoría Primera A
Winners (9): 1977, 1980, 1993, 1995, 2004–II, 2010–I, 2011–II, 2018–II, 2019–I
Runners-up (10): 1948, 1970, 1983, 2000, 2003–I, 2009–I, 2014–I, 2015–II, 2016–I, 2019–II
 Copa Colombia
Winners (2): 2015, 2017
Runners-up (1): 2016
 Superliga Colombiana
Winners (2): 2019, 2020
Runners-up (1): 2012

International
 Copa Sudamericana
Runners-up (1): 2018

 Reebok Cup
Winners (1): 1997

Performance in CONMEBOL competitions
 Copa Libertadores: 13 appearances
Best: Semi-finals in 1994
 Copa Sudamericana: 5 appearances
2004: Quarterfinals
2015: Second stage
2016: Quarterfinals
2017: Semi-finals
2018: Runners-up
 Copa CONMEBOL: 1 appearance
1992: Quarter-finals

Players

Current squad

Personnel

Technical staff

Notable players

Most appearances

Most goals

Historic players

  Carlos Babington
  Daniel Carnevali
  Edgardo Bauza
  
  Omar Pérez
  José Daniel Ponce
  Juan Ramón Verón
  Carlos Ischia
  Paulo César Caju
  Cassiano
  Dida
  Garrincha
  Heleno de Freitas
  Quarentinha
  Víctor Ephanor
  Cristián Montecinos
  Nelson Tapia
  Matías Fernández
  Alfredo Arango
  Hayder Palacio
  Martín Arzuaga
  Carlos Bacca
  Jorge Bolaño
  Teófilo Gutiérrez
  Giovanni Hernández
  Vladimir Hernández
  Roberto Meléndez
  Alexis Mendoza
  Víctor Pacheco
  Efraín "El Caimán" Sánchez
  Iván Valenciano
  Carlos "El Pibe" Valderrama
  Luis Díaz
  Alex "Didi" Valderrama
  Béla Sárosi
  László Szőke
  Julio César Uribe
  Julio Comesaña
  Sebastián Viera

Managers

Affiliated clubs
  Barranquilla Currently in the second division

References

External links

 Official Web site of Club Atlético Junior
 Fuerza Tiburona Supporter's Team Website

 
Junior
Association football clubs established in 1924
1924 establishments in Colombia
Categoría Primera A clubs